HD 35984 is star in the northern constellation Auriga. It has an apparent magnitude of 6.20, which, according to the Bortle scale, indicates it is faintly visible to the naked eye from dark rural skies. Parallax measurements by the Hipparcos satellite indicates it lies at a distance of roughly 290 light years away.

A stellar classification of F6III suggests that this is an evolved giant star that has consumed the supply of hydrogen at its core. However, X-ray emission, variations in luminosity, and levels of lithium may indicate that this is instead a weak-lined T Tauri star—a low mass pre-main sequence star that is relatively poor in circumstellar matter.

References

External links
 HR 1822
 Image HD 35984

Auriga (constellation)
035984
025730
F-type giants
1822
Durchmusterung objects